Fraser Milligan (born 19 April 1989) is a Scottish footballer. He began his career with Dundee United, where he made only one first team appearance. He joined Montrose in 2009, initially on loan, before a permanent transfer later that year. He later joined Tayport, and emigrated to Australia in 2012.

Playing career
Milligan was born in Dundee and joined Dundee United as an 8-year-old, first attending the Jim McLean Coaching School then graduating to Dundee United's Youth Initiative set-up at the age of 12. He plays as a right-back or wide right in midfield. In early January 2009, he was one of three United players to feature as trialists for Albion Rovers in a friendly match, although Albion chose to take only defensive colleague Sean Fleming on loan. Two months later, Milligan moved on loan to Montrose for the remainder of the season, making his debut as a substitute alongside fellow United loan player Gordon Pope in the home defeat to Forfar Athletic, who featured another loan player from United, Johnny Russell. Milligan, like Pope, made the move permanent in May. After leaving Montrose in 2011, he signed for junior club Tayport, but left them in December 2012 when he emigrated to Australia.

Statistics

External links

References

1989 births
Footballers from Dundee
Living people
Scottish footballers
Scottish Premier League players
Dundee United F.C. players
Scottish Football League players
Montrose F.C. players
Association football defenders
Scottish Junior Football Association players
Scottish emigrants to Australia
Tayport F.C. players